Stig Arnold "Stisse" Ekman (24 July 1944) is a Swedish former footballer who played as a midfielder. He played for Degerfors IF in the 1960s and was part of the Degerfors team that finished second during the 1963 Allsvenskan season. He played once for the Sweden U21 team in the same year. He is currently part of Degerfors IF's coaching staff.

Club career 
Ekman came through the Degerfors IF youth academy and became a prominent player for the senior team in the 1960s, helping the team finished second in Allsvenskan in 1963. He played a total of five Allsvenskan seasons for the club.

International career 
Ekman represented the Sweden U21 team once on 14 August 1963, in a friendly 2–0 win against Finland.

Post-playing career 
Ekman has served as part of the Degerfors IF coaching staff since 1993.

References 

1944 births
Living people
People from Degerfors Municipality
Swedish footballers
Association football midfielders
Sweden international footballers
Allsvenskan players
Degerfors IF players